Leptochilus pothifolius is a species of fern in the family Polypodiaceae. It is found from the Himalayas through temperate East Asia to the Philippines. It has a large number of synonyms.

References 

Polypodiaceae
Flora of Asia
Plants described in 1825